Oneida is a town in Scott County, Tennessee, United States. The population was 3,787 at the 2020 census.

Oneida is known for its proximity to the Big South Fork National River and Recreation Area.  The town is named for Oneida, New York, the home of several railroad executives who helped develop the town in the late 19th century.

Geography
Oneida is located at  (36.500535, -84.516553).

Climate

Demographics

2020 census

As of the 2020 United States census, there were 3,787 people, 1,661 households, and 1,115 families residing in the town.

2000 census
As of the census of 2000, there were 3,615 people, 1,588 households, and 986 families residing in the town. The population density was 355.4 people per square mile (137.2/km2). There were 1,715 housing units at an average density of 168.6 per square mile (65.1/km2). The racial makeup of the town was 98.34% White, 0.03% African American, 0.14% Native American, 0.39% Asian, 0.19% from other races, and 0.91% from two or more races. Hispanic or Latino of any race were 0.30% of the population.

There were 1,588 households, out of which 30.8% had children under the age of 18 living with them, 43.3% were married couples living together, 15.4% had a female householder with no husband present, and 37.9% were non-families. 35.5% of all households were made up of individuals, and 14.5% had someone living alone who was 65 years of age or older. The average household size was 2.24 and the average family size was 2.91.

In the town, the population was spread out, with 24.3% under the age of 18, 10.1% from 18 to 24, 25.9% from 25 to 44, 24.0% from 45 to 64, and 15.7% who were 65 years of age or older. The median age was 38 years. For every 100 females, there were 85.4 males. For every 100 females age 18 and over, there were 81.7 males.

The median income for a household in the town was $23,767, and the median income for a family was $29,786. Males had a median income of $23,571 versus $24,516 for females. The per capita income for the town was $13,906. About 18.8% of families and 21.1% of the population were below the poverty line, including 26.4% of those under age 18 and 11.5% of those age 65 or over.

Media
 The Independent Herald
 Hive 105, WBNT-FM
 MBRTV Channel 5
 The Scott County News The county's oldest newspaper, established in 1916.

References

External links

Official website

Towns in Scott County, Tennessee
Towns in Tennessee
Coal towns in Tennessee